Simone Angel (born Simone Engeln, 25 December 1971) is a Dutch TV host.

MTV
Born in Woerden, Netherlands, Angel moved from there to London, UK, when she was 18. Here she was hired by MTV Europe, becoming the youngest VJ and, after working for nine years, she also became one of the longest serving VJs for MTV. Angel was the host of many different programmes broadcast from various parts of the world, and was also the host of the MTV programme Party Zone, where she presented dance music videos.

Discography
Angel released four singles, some in various versions. In the United Kingdom, Angel was signed to Bros/East 17 manager Tom Watkins' Atomic record label, alongside the band Nitro.

 "Contact" (12" Netherlands)
 "Walk on Water" (CD5" UK, 2x12" UK) (1994), #8 Israel
 "Let This Feeling" (12" UK, CD5" UK, 12" Italy) (1993) - UK #60, #8 Israel
 "When Love Rules the World" (CD5" UK) (1991)
 "When Love Rules the World" (The Jon Marsh Sessions) (12" UK) (1991)

Other work
As well as hosting shows on MTV, Simone has also hosted various awards shows, such as the Webby Awards and some Extreme Sports Awards. She was also on the jury on the German TV show Popstars. Angel and Andy Hunt, former professional football player, own the Belize resort, 'Jungle Dome'. Angel is also working with a charity through the Jaden Foundation, aimed at improving the education for the children of Belize.

On 8 December 2005, Angel and Hunt were married. They continue to run the Belize Jungle Dome and have two children together, named Lucas and Aidan.

References

External links
 Discography
 Simone Angel's blog from Belize
 Jaden Foundation

1971 births
Living people
VJs (media personalities)
Dutch dance musicians
People from Woerden
21st-century Dutch singers
21st-century Dutch women singers